Ministry of Defence Caledonia (MoD Caledonia) is a military establishment of the Ministry of Defence based at the former Royal Naval Dockyard, Rosyth in Scotland.

History 
HMS Caledonia was first opened in 1937 and responsible for artificer apprentice training from 1937 to 1985, with many thousands of young men going through training. The site was subsequently reduced to become part of HMS Cochrane.

Just before the beginning of the Second World War, Boys' Training Ship Caledonia was based here.  By this time Admiral Sir Charles Ramsey, the Commander-in-Chief, Rosyth, responsible for naval operations in the area, was based at  just down the road at the Dockyard.

In 1993 the Ministry of Defence announced plans to privatise Rosyth. Babcock International, who had bought out Thorn's share of the original Babcock Thorn consortium, was the only company to submit a bid and after protracted negotiations purchased the yard in January 1997. In 1996, following the decommissioning and privatisation of the Royal Naval Dockyard Rosyth, MoD Caledonia was opened on the site of the former dockyard.

Following the Options for Change review and the collapse of the Soviet Union, the reserve unit  was moved from Pitreavie Castle to HMS Caledonia, where it has been based ever since.

In 2018 concerns arose over the future of the site; it was reported that it could close in 2022, despite efforts to save it, this was later extended to 2026.

Based units 
 Royal Navy
 Headquarters, 
 Royal Naval Support Establishment HMS Caledonia
 Royal Navy Careers Headquarters (North)
 Royal Naval Acquaint Centre (Northern)
 Naval Regional Command Scotland and Northern Ireland (NRCSNI)
 Directorate of Naval Shore Telecommunications (North)
 Royal Marines
 Band of His Majesty's Royal Marines, Scotland
Royal Air Force
RAF Training and Evaluation Support Team
No. 1 Specialist Police Wing RAF
 Community Cadet Forces
 TS Fife, Sea Cadet Corps
 Sea Cadet Training Centre (National Sea Cadets Training Centre)
1145 (Dunfermline) Squadron, Central Scotland Wing, Air Training Corps

Footnotes 

Buildings and structures in Fife
Scottish coast
Royal Navy bases in Scotland
Rosyth
Ports and harbours of Scotland
Royal Navy shore establishments
1996 establishments in Scotland
Firth of Forth
Installations of the Ministry of Defence (United Kingdom)